Krishan Hooda (1945-2020) is an Indian politician who was elected as a Member of the Haryana Legislative Assembly from the Baroda Assembly constituency from 2009 to 2020. He was representing the Indian National Congress.

He won 4 times from the Garhi Sampla-Kiloi Assembly constituency.

Early life and education 
Hooda was born in Garhi Sampla Kiloi, Haryana in 1945 to Bhale Ram.

He is 9th pass from Government High School, Rohtak.

References 

1945 births
2020 deaths
Members of the Haryana Legislative Assembly